Bojana (Slovenian: Bojana; Macedonian and Serbian Cyrillic: Бојана; Russian and Bulgarian Cyrillic: Бояна; transcribed Boyana) is a Slavic given name. It is feminine version of name Bojan derived from the Slavic noun boj "battle". The name is mainly used within the area of Southeastern Europe.

People named Bojana:
 Bojana Bobusic, an Australian tennis player
 Bojana Drča, a Serbian volleyball player
 Bojana Janković, a Serbian basketball player
 Bojana Jovanovski, a Serbian tennis player
 Bojana Milenković, a Serbian volleyball player
 Bojana Milošević, a Serbian basketball player
 Bojana Novakovic, a Serbian-Australian actress
 Bojana Ordinačev, a Serbian actress
 Bojana Popović, a Montenegrin handballer
 Bojana Radulović, a Yugoslav and Hungarian handballer
 Bojana Sentaler, a Serbian-Canadian fashion designer
 Bojana Stamenov, a Serbian singer and musician
 Bojana Todorović, a Serbian volleyball player
 Bojana Vulić, a Serbian basketball player

Serbian feminine given names